John Herron (November 15, 1853 – August 20, 1936) was a politician from Western Canada.

Political career
Herron was born in Ashton, Carleton County, Canada West.  He was first elected to Parliament in the Alberta Provisional District in the 1904 federal election; he defeated Malcolm McKenzie by less than 100 votes.

After the creation of the province of Alberta, Herron ran in the new electoral district of Macleod in the 1908 federal election and was re-elected.  In the 1911 election he was defeated by David Warnock of the Liberal Party of Canada.

Herron tried to return to Parliament in the 1925 federal election. He ran against George Coote and former Alberta MLA Thomas Milnes and was defeated.  He ran again in the 1926 election but was defeated again.

References

External links
 

1853 births
1936 deaths
Conservative Party of Canada (1867–1942) MPs
Members of the House of Commons of Canada from Alberta
Members of the House of Commons of Canada from the Northwest Territories